The Foundry Discovery Protocol (FDP) is a proprietary data link layer protocol. It was developed by Foundry Networks.

Although Foundry Networks was acquired by Brocade Communications Systems, the protocol is still supported.

External links
 Foundry Discovery Protocol (FDP) , Multi-Service IronWare Feature and RFC Support Matrix, product documentation by Brocade Communications Systems, January 24, 2014

Device discovery protocols
Network protocols